The 1923–24 Illinois Fighting Illini men's basketball team represented the University of Illinois.

Regular season
Second year Fighting Illini coach, Craig Ruby, took advantage of 12 returning players from a team that finished tied for fourth in the Big Ten a season earlier. The 1923–24 campaign was the first of two conference titles during Ruby's tenure as the Fighting Illini's head coach. The final conference record of eight wins and four losses tied the Illini with Wisconsin and Chicago in the race to be the best in the Big Ten.  The overall record for this team was 11 wins and 6 losses. The starting lineup included captain G.E. Potter, T.D. Karnes and John Mauer at forward, Leland Stillwell at center, and Jack Lipe and R.H. Popken as guards.

Roster

Source

Schedule
												
Source																

|-	
!colspan=12 style="background:#DF4E38; color:white;"| Non-Conference regular season
|- align="center" bgcolor=""

			

|-	
!colspan=9 style="background:#DF4E38; color:#FFFFFF;"|Big Ten regular season

Bold Italic connotes conference game

Awards and honors

References

Illinois Fighting Illini
Illinois Fighting Illini men's basketball seasons
Illinois Fighting Illini men's b
Illinois Fighting Illini men's b